Emancipation is a 2022 American historical action thriller film set in Louisiana in the 1860s after President Abraham Lincoln issued the Emancipation Proclamation to end most slavery in the US. The film was directed by Antoine Fuqua and co-produced by Will Smith, who stars as a runaway slave headed for Baton Rouge. He must survive the swamps while being chased by slave catchers and their dogs. Written by William N. Collage, the biographical film is loosely based on a possibly conglomerated story of the lives of either or both of two formerly enslaved Black men named Gordon and "Whipped Peter". That story was made famous by the photograph of a man's bare back heavily scourged from an overseer's whippings, published worldwide as magazine illustrations in 1863, and gave the abolitionist movement proof of the cruelty of slavery. Ben Foster stars as a ruthless slave hunter and Charmaine Bingwa as an enslaved wife and mother. The film employs an artistic desaturated color palette reminiscent of black-and-white film.

Producer Joey McFarland began researching the story in 2018, and hired Collage to write the script. The film was officially announced in June 2020, with Fuqua to direct and Smith to star. Filming was in Louisiana between July and August 2021, with Apple paying  to acquire the rights to the film, outbidding several other studios.

It was screened in Washington, D.C. on October 1, 2022, and released in select cinemas on December 2, 2022, then streamed on December 9 on Apple TV+. The film received mixed reviews from critics, who praised Smith's performance, but criticized the screenplay and its handling of real-life events.

Plot

In the 1860s, the African-American enslaved Peter escapes from Louisiana to freedom. In the opening scene, Peter is seen sitting on the floor knelt before his wife. His children are sitting around him, eagerly listening to the words he speaks as he washes his wife’s feet. Suddenly a group of white men appear in the doorway and tells Peter to "come on boy". They snatched him out of the house and Peter puts up a brief fight until one of the men points a gun at his wife’s head. He then tell the men that he will walk. Peter is then hit in the back of his head, put into the back of a cage, and taken from his family to an unknown destination. He works on a railroad in Clinton, Louisiana.

Cast

 Will Smith as Peter
 Ben Foster as Fassel
 Charmaine Bingwa as Dodienne
 Steven Ogg as Sergeant Howard
 Mustafa Shakir as Andre Cailloux
 Timothy Hutton as Senator John Lyons
 Gilbert Owuor as Gordon
 Grant Harvey as Leeds
 Ronnie Gene Blevins as Harrington
 Jabbar Lewis as Tomas
 Michael Luwoye as John
 Aaron Moten as Knowls
 Imani Pullum as Betsy
 David Denman as General William Dwight

Production
On June 15, 2020, it was reported that Antoine Fuqua would direct Will Smith in Emancipation, based on a spec script written by William N. Collage. Producer Joey McFarland, who had started researching and developing the film in 2018, recruited Collage to write the script. Fuqua said:

In August 2021, Ben Foster, Charmaine Bingwa, Gilbert Owuor, and Mustafa Shakir joined the cast. Smith earned $35 million for his part in the film.

Principal photography was expected to begin on May 3, 2021, in Los Angeles. It was later set to begin on June 21, 2021, in Georgia, but on April 12, it was announced that the film would be shot elsewhere due to the recently-enacted Election Integrity Act of 2021. Smith and Fuqua said in a joint statement: "We cannot in good conscience provide economic support to a government that enacts regressive voting laws that are designed to restrict voter access." Filming was announced to take place in New Orleans from July 12 to August 21, 2021. On August 2, filming paused for five days due to several positive COVID-19 tests. Additional casting for the film was announced in November and December.

Release
A screening of Emancipation was held at the Congressional Black Caucus Foundation's 51st Annual Legislative Conference in Washington, D.C., on October 1, 2022, with Smith and Fuqua in attendance to give a subsequent Q&A discussion. It was screened in Los Angeles, on October 24, 2022. The film premiered in theaters on December 2, 2022, and was streamed on Apple TV+ on December 9.

In May 2022, the film's release was reportedly delayed to a 2023 date, due to numerous production delays, the controversy over Smith slapping Chris Rock at the 94th Academy Awards, and an overcrowded film release schedule from Apple. It was subsequently moved to December 2022.

Reception

Accolades

See also
 List of films featuring slavery

References

External links
 

2022 action drama films
2022 action thriller films
2020s American films
2020s chase films
2020s English-language films
2020s historical action films
2020s historical drama films
2020s historical thriller films
Action films based on actual events
American action drama films
American action thriller films
American chase films
American films based on actual events
American historical action films
American historical drama films
American historical thriller films
Apple TV+ original films
Drama films based on actual events
Escape Artists films
Film productions suspended due to the COVID-19 pandemic
Films about American slavery
Films directed by Antoine Fuqua
Films produced by Will Smith
Films scored by Marcelo Zarvos
Films set in Louisiana
Films shot in New Orleans
Overbrook Entertainment films
Thriller films based on actual events